Center Township is one of six townships in Martin County, Indiana, United States. As of the 2010 census, its population was 1,654 and it contained 811 housing units.

Geography

Cities, towns, villages
 Shoals (west half)

Unincorporated towns
 Dover Hill at 
 Hindostan Falls at 
 Pleasant Valley at 
 Shoals Overlook at 
(This list is based on USGS data and may include former settlements.)

Cemeteries
The township contains these three cemeteries: Hall, McBrides and Sholts.

Major highways
  U.S. Route 50
  U.S. Route 150
  State Road 550

School districts
 Shoals Community School Corporation

Political districts
 Indiana's 8th congressional district
 State House District 62
 State House District 63
 State Senate District 48

References

Sources
 
 United States Census Bureau 2008 TIGER/Line Shapefiles
 IndianaMap

External links
 Indiana Township Association
 United Township Association of Indiana
 City-Data.com page for Center Township

Townships in Martin County, Indiana
Townships in Indiana